Kim Seung-il (born 2 September 1945) is a North Korean football forward who played for North Korea in the 1966 FIFA World Cup. He also played for Moranbong Sports Team.

References

1945 births
North Korean footballers
North Korea international footballers
Association football forwards
Moranbong Sports Club players
1966 FIFA World Cup players
Living people